Bud is a nickname for:

In arts and entertainment
 William Bud Abbott (1897–1974), American actor/comedian
 Julian Bud Blake (1918–2005), American cartoonist
 Roman Bohnen (1901–1949), American actor
 Bud Collyer (1908–1969), born Clayton Johnson Heermance, Jr., American TV game show host and radio actor
 Bud Cort (born 1948), born Walter Edward Cox, American actor 
 Harry Bud Fisher (1885–1954), originator of the comic strip Mutt and Jeff
 Bud Flanagan (1896-1968), born Chaim Reuben Weintrop, English music hall and vaudeville entertainer
 Lawrence Bud Freeman (1906–1991), American jazz musician, bandleader and composer
 Buddy Bud Green (1897–1981), Austrian-born American songwriter
 Jonah Bud Greenspan (1926–2010), American documentary filmmaker
 A. B. Guthrie, Jr. (1901–1991), American Pulitzer Prize-winning novelist, screenwriter and historian
 William Bud Jamison (1894–1944), American film actor
 Clarence Budington Kelland (1881–1964), American writer and politician
 William Bud Luckey (1934-2018), American cartoonist, animator, singer, musician, composer and voice actor
 Henry David Bud Molin (1925–2007), American film editor and television director
 William Bud Neill (1911–1970), Scottish cartoonist 
 Leonard Bud Osborne (1884–1964), American film actor
 Lowell Bud Paxson (1935–2015), American media executive
 Earl Bud Powell (1924–1966), American jazz pianist
 Clifford Bud Shank (1926–2009), American jazz musician
 Bud S. Smith, American film editor
 John Bud Sparhawk (born 1937), American science fiction author
 Bud Spencer (1929–2016), born Carlo Pedersoli, Italian actor, swimmer, and water polo player
 Charles Bud Tingwell (1923–2009), Australian actor
 Clarence Bud Webster (1952–2016), American science fiction and fantasy writer
 George Bud Westmore (1918–1973), Hollywood makeup artist
 Alan Bud Yorkin (1926–2015), American film and television producer and director

In sports
 Kenneth Bud Adams (1923–2013), owner of the Tennessee Titans National Football League franchise
 Harry Bud Black (born 1957), American Major League Baseball manager and retired pitcher
 Robert "Bud" or Buddy Blattner (1920–2009), American baseball player and sportscaster
Cory "Bud" Bourn (born 1977), American baseball player
 Leon Bud Carson (1930–2005), American football coach
 Alexander Bud Cook (1907–1993), Canadian National Hockey League player
 Leavitt Bud Daley (born 1932), American Major League Baseball player
 Grover Bud Delp (1932–2006), American Hall-of-Fame Thoroughbred racehorse trainer
 John Bud Fowler (1858–1913), African-American  baseball player, field manager and club organizer
 Harry Bud Grant (1927–2023), American athlete and National Football League head coach
 Darrel Bud Harrelson (born 1944), American retired Major League Baseball player
 Borden Bud Korchak (1927–2010), Canadian football player
 Robert Bud Moore (American football) (born 1939), American football player and coach
 Walter Bud Moore (NASCAR owner) (born 1925), former NASCAR owner
 Paul Bud Moore (racing driver) (born 1941), former NASCAR driver
 David Bud Norris (born 1985), American Major League Baseball pitcher
 Carlos Bud Ogden (born 1946), American retired college and National Basketball Association player
 John Bud Palmer (1921–2013), American basketball player and sportscaster
 Norman Bud Poile (1924–2005), Canadian National Hockey League player, coach, general manager and league executive; member of the Hockey Hall of Fame
 Bud Schwenk (1917–1980), American professional football quarterback
 Bud Schultz (born 1959), American retired tennis player
 Allan Bud Selig (born 1934), Commissioner of Major League Baseball
 Charles Bud Wilkinson (1916–1994), American college football head coach

Politicians
 Joseph Bud Boyce (1924–1984), Canadian politician
 Clarence Bud Brown (politician) (1927–2022), American politician
 Horace Bud Olson (1925–2002), Canadian businessman and politician
 Louis Bud Sherman (1926–2015), Canadian politician
 Elmer Bud Shuster (born 1932), American politician
 Charles Bud Wildman (born 1946), Canadian politician

Other
 Arthur Bud Collins (1929-2016), American journalist and television commentator
 George Bud Day (1925–2013), US Air Force colonel, pilot and Medal of Honor recipient
 Wilson Flagg (1938–2001), US Navy rear admiral
 Bernard Bud Konheim (1935–2019), American fashion businessman
 Walker Bud Mahurin (1918–2010), US Air Force World War II ace
 James I. Robertson Jr. (1930–2019), American historian
 Edwin Bud Shrake (1931–2009), American journalist, sportswriter, novelist, biographer and screenwriter
 James Bud Walton (1921–1995), co-founder of Wal-Mart and brother of Sam Walton

See also 
 
 
 Buddy (nickname)

Lists of people by nickname
English masculine given names
Given names